Fleeman is a surname. Notable people with the surname include:

Daniel Fleeman (born 1982), English racing cyclist
E. C. Fleeman (1907–1962), American politician
Jamie Fleeman (1713–1778), Scottish jester

See also
Freeman (surname)